Butterfield may refer to:

 Butterfield (surname)
 Butterfield Market

Places
	
 Butterfield, Dublin, a suburb and townland of Dublin, Ireland
 Butterfield Green, Luton, England

United States
 Butterfield, Minnesota
 Butterfield, Missouri
 Butterfield, Texas
 Butterfield Township, Michigan
 Butterfield Township, Minnesota
 Butterfield, Illinois

Fiction
 Butterfield, a fictional town in Kansas in L. Frank Baum's 1909 novel The Road to Oz
 Butterfield, a fictional butler of Watkyn Bassett in Wodehouse's Jeeves stories
 Brian Butterfield, overweight salesman character from The Peter Serafinowicz Show

Other uses
 Butterfield Bank, an international bank based in Bermuda
 Butterfield & Butterfield, a large auction house based in San Francisco
 BUtterfield 8, a 1960 film with Elizabeth Taylor and Laurence Harvey based on a novel of the same name by John O'Hara
 Butterfield Overland Mail, a stagecoach service in the United States operating from 1858 to 1861
 Butterfield Overland Mail, a.k.a. Butterfield Stage, Stagecoach service in the US (1858–1861)
Butterfield station, a light rail station in Sacramento, California, US
 Butterfield and Swire, a British trading company from the 1860s to 1960s